The Bayer designation Tau Aquarii (τ Aqr / τ Aquarii) is shared by two star systems, in the constellation Aquarius:
 τ1 Aquarii
 τ2 Aquarii
They are separated by 0.65° on the sky.

All of them were member of asterism 羽林軍 (Yǔ Lín Jūn), Palace Guard, Encampment mansion.

References

Aquarii, Tau
Aquarius (constellation)